Penguin Random House LLC is an Anglo-American multinational conglomerate publishing company formed on July 1, 2013, from the merger of Penguin Group and Random House.

On April 2, 2020, Bertelsmann announced the completion of its purchase of Penguin Random House, which had been announced in December 2019, by buying Pearson plc's 25% ownership of the company. With that purchase, Bertelsmann became the sole owner of Penguin Random House. Bertelsmann's German-language publishing group Verlagsgruppe Random House will be completely integrated into Penguin Random House, adding 45 imprints to the company, for a total of 365 imprints.

As of 2021, Penguin Random House employed about 10,000 people globally and published 15,000 titles annually under its 250 divisions and imprints. These titles include fiction and nonfiction for adults and children in both print and digital. Penguin Random House comprises Penguin and Random House in the U.S., UK, Canada, Australia, New Zealand, Portugal, and India; Penguin in Brazil, Asia and South Africa; Dorling Kindersley worldwide; and Random House's companies in Spain, Hispanic America, and Germany.

On November 25, 2020, The New York Times reported that Penguin Random House was planning to purchase Simon & Schuster from Paramount Global for $2.175 billion. However, on November 2, 2021, the U.S. Department of Justice sued to stop the deal on antitrust grounds, a suit that eventually succeeded on October 31, 2022. The deal formally collapsed on November 22, 2022.

History 
Penguin Random House was founded on July 1, 2013, by Markus Dohle upon the completion of a £2.4 billion transaction between Bertelsmann and Pearson to merge their respective trade publishing companies, Random House and Penguin Group. Bertelsmann and Pearson, the parent companies, initially owned 53% and 47%, respectively. Jane Ciabattari of Library Journal has referred to this merger as the publishing industry's response to the increasing dominance of Amazon.com in the book market. Markus Dohle was named CEO of the new company, which had more than 10,000 employees worldwide with 250 imprints and publishing houses and a publishing list of more than 15,000 new titles a year. Penguin Random House relaunched Book Country, Penguin's online writing community, on July 29, 2013. On September 24, 2014, Random House Studio signed a first-look production deal with Universal Pictures, under which Random House would be the producer of films based on Penguin Random House books. The Universal subsidiary Focus Features has frequently collaborated with Random House Films. Having previously created Puffin Rock animation, Richard Haines was chosen to head Penguin Random House Children's TV development strategy with the assistance of licensing, publishing, and TV development executive Emily Campan.

In November 2015, Pearson announced it would rebrand to focus on its education division. On July 11, 2017, Pearson sold a 22% stake in the business to Bertelsmann, thereby retaining a 25% holding. On December 18, 2019, Bertelsmann agreed to acquire Pearson's 25% stake in Penguin Random House, making it a wholly owned subsidiary of Bertelsmann. The sale was completed on April 2, 2020. In June 2020, Penguin Random House was one of a group of publishers who sued the Internet Archive, arguing that its collection of e-books was denying authors and publishers revenue and accusing the library of "willful mass copyright infringement".

On November 25, 2020, Penguin Random House agreed to purchase American publisher Simon & Schuster from ViacomCBS for $2.175 billion. A formal regulatory approval process will follow the purchase agreement. On November 2, 2021, the US Justice Department filed a civil antitrust lawsuit to block Penguin Random House's proposed acquisition of Simon & Schuster. The lawsuit alleges that the acquisition would create a publisher with too much influence over books and author payments. On November 21, 2022, Penguin Random House decided to scrap the whole deal. As a result, it will have to pay a $200m termination fee to Paramount, a mother company of Simon & Schuster.

Divisions and imprints

DK 

DK (Dorling Kindersley) was founded in London in 1974 and is a reference publisher focusing on non-fiction for adults and children.

 Alpha, publishes Complete Idiot's Guides

As of 2015, DK also has official publishing relationships with Angry Birds, Lego, Marvel, Star Wars, and Disney.

Crown Publishing Group 

Crown Publishing was founded in 1933 as the Outlet Book Company, a remainder house, and is now a publisher of fiction and narrative non-fiction. In 2018, Crown was combined with the main Random House Publishing Group.
 Amphoto Books, publishes photography books
 Broadway Books, founded in 1996 as part of Bantam Doubleday Dell and is now the paperback imprint of Crown 
 Clarkson Potter, produces cookbooks, illustrated gift books, and journals
 Crown Archetype, hardcover publisher of pop-culture titles 
 Crown Business, publishes business-related content
 Crown Forum, publishes political discourse
 Harmony Books, publishes self-help titles
 Hogarth Press, partnership between Crown in the US and Windus in the UK
 Convergent, Image Catholic Books (Doubleday Religion), Waterbrook & Multnomah publish Christian non-fiction and fiction titles
 Pam Krauss Books, founded in 1915 and publishes culinary, food, and lifestyle related titles
 Rodale Books
 Ten Speed Press, joined Crown in 2009 as a West Coast publisher of nonfiction and gift titles 
 Tim Duggan Books, founded in 2014
 Watson-Guptill, publishes illustrated art books as part of Ten Speed Press

Knopf Doubleday Publishing Group 
 Alfred A. Knopf, publisher of hardcover fiction and nonfiction, founded in 1915 by Alfred A. Knopf, and Blanche Knopf. Titles under Alfred A. Knopf have won 58 Pulitzers as well as Nobel and National Book Awards.
 Doubleday, publisher of commercial, literary, and serious nonfiction founded in 1897
 Pantheon, founded in 1942 by Kurt Wolff
 Schocken, publisher of Judaica, became a part of Random House in 1945
 Vintage Books, trade paperback publisher founded by Alfred A. Knopf in 1954
 Anchor Books, publisher of history, science, women's studies, sociology and fiction 
 Vintage Español, Spanish-language publisher in the United States, founded in 1994 by Alfred A. Knopf
 Black Lizard, also known as Vintage Crime, publisher of crime fiction, acquired by Random House in 1990
 Nan A. Talese, literary imprint formed in 1990 to house authors published by editor Nan A. Talese 
 Everyman's Library, a series of reprinted classic literature currently published in hardback

Penguin Publishing Group 

 Avery, publisher of nonfiction and lifestyle books founded in 1974
 Berkley Publishing Group/New American Library, contain several imprints including Jove, Signet, Ace, Roc, Sensation, and Caliber
 DAW, publisher of science fiction and fantasy
 Dutton, small boutique fiction and non-fiction publisher of about 40 books per year
 Putnam, publisher founded in 1838
 Pamela Dorman Books/Viking, established in 2010 as a boutique publisher of VP Pamela Dorman
 Penguin, established in 1935 in the UK as a publisher of mass market paperbacks; houses Penguin Books, Penguin Classics, and most recently Penguin Press
 Perigee, originally the trade paperback imprint for G.P. Putnam's Sons; publishes prescriptive non-fiction, self-help and how-to books
 Plume, trade paperback imprint with a focus on multi-cultural and LGBT publishing 
 Portfolio, founded in 2001 as a business imprint
 Riverhead, publisher of literary fiction and non-fiction founded in 1994
 Sentinel, founded in 2003 as a conservative imprint
 Tarcher Perigee, publisher of mind, body, and spiritualism titles
 Viking Press, founded in 1925 and publishes both fiction and non-fiction titles

Penguin Young Readers Group 
Penguin Young Readers Group is a division devoted to books for young readers and young adults. 
 Dial Books for Young Readers, publishes about 70 hardcover children's books per year
 Firebird, publishes young adult science fiction and fantasy
 Frederick Warne, publisher founded in 1865 that develops brands based on classic children's literature such as Peter Rabbit 
 G.P. Putnam's Sons Books for Young Readers, publisher of picture books
 Grosset & Dunlap, publisher of paperback series, leveled readers, nonfiction, brands, and licenses for ages 0–12
 Kathy Dawson Books, launched in 2014 by publisher Kathy Dawson to publish hardcover middle-grade and YA fiction
 Ladybird Books, publishes books for toddlers
 Nancy Paulsen Books, launched in 2011 by publisher Nancy Paulsen to publish picture books
 Philomel Books
 Price Stern Sloan (PSS!), founded to publish the Mad Libs books in the 1960s, expanded to publish additional children's, novelty, and humor titles
 Puffin Books, publishes books for young readers in various formats
 Razorbill, publishes middle grade and young adult books
 Speak, launched in 2002 to publish classic and new young adult fiction
 Viking, publishes books for young readers

Random House Publishing Group 
 Ballantine Books, founded in 1952 to publish fiction and nonfiction hardcover and paperback titles
 Bantam Books, originally a publisher of mass-market reprints; currently publishes fiction and nonfiction in all formats
 Delacorte Press, founded in 1921 as a publisher of pulp magazines, detective stories, and movie articles, has expanded to publish original fiction in all formats 
 Del Rey Books, branch of Ballantine Books that focuses on science fiction and fantasy titles
 The Dial Press, literary publisher
 Modern Library, publisher of American and international classics founded by Boni & Liveright
 Random House, originally founded in 1927 by Bennett Cerf and Donald Klopfer, and publishes fiction
 Heyne Publishing, a German fiction Publisher for mass-market
 Spiegel & Grau 
 Sugar23 Books, fiction and non-fiction 
 Alibi, Flirt, Hydra, and Loveswept, publish e-originals in genre fiction

Random House Children's Books 
 Alfred A. Knopf Books for Young Readers, publisher of board books, picture books, novels and non-fiction
 Bluefire, fantasy imprint for middle grade and young adult readers
 Crown Books for Young Readers
 Dragonfly, publishes paperback picture books
 Ember, publishes young adult and middle grade trade paperbacks, such as titles by Judy Blume and Dana Reinhardt
 Golden Books, picture book, novelty, and activity book publisher launched in 1900
 Laurel-Leaf, publishes young adult literature in a mass-market format
 Little Tiger Press, British publisher
 The Princeton Review, publishes print and digital test prep materials 
 Random House Books for Young Readers, publisher of Dr. Seuss, Babar, Magic Tree House series, Junie B. Jones, and Step into Reading
 Random House Graphic, launched in 2018, publishes graphic novels
 Schwartz and Wade, launched in 2005 and directed by Anne Schwartz and Lee Wade
 Sylvan Learning, publishes workbooks and study aids.
 Yearling Books, publishes middle grade paperbacks
 Wendy Lamb Books, publisher of middle-grade and young adult fiction launched in 2002

Penguin Random House Digital Publishing Group 
 Random House Puzzles & Games
 Sasquatch Books
 Audiobooks
 Books on Tape
 Listening Library
 Penguin Audio
 Random House Audio
 Playaway
 Reference
 Random House Reference

Penguin Random House International 
 Companhia das Letras (70% Brazil)
 Alfaguara
 Objetiva
 Suma de Letras
 Zahar
 Penguin Random House Australia 
 Penguin Random House Group (UK)
 Penguin Random House Grupo Editorial (Spain/Portugal/Latin America)
 Alfaguara
 Ediciones B
 Editorial Bruguera
 Plaza & Janés
 Santillana Ediciones Generales
 Penguin Random House India 
 Duckbill Books
 Penguin Random House New Zealand 
 Penguin Random House Canada 
 Penguin Random House Struik (South Africa)
 Transworld Ireland 
 Verlagsgruppe Penguin Random House (Germany)

Penguin Random House Publisher Services 
Handling distribution and marketing for Shambhala Publications, National Geographic Books, Wizards of the Coast, Kodansha USA (including Vertical Inc.), New York Review Books, Titan Books, Other Press, North Atlantic Books, Blue Star Press, DC Comics, and Dark Horse Comics among others.

It also handles direct market distribution for Marvel Comics starting October 1, 2021  and direct market distributution for IDW Publishing starting June 1, 2022.

Ebury Publishing 

 BBC Books
 Ebury Press
 Rider
 Time Out
 Virgin Books
 Vermilion

Subsidiaries

Book Country 
Book Country was a subsidiary online writing and publishing community. Book Country was launched in April 2011 with a focus on romance, mystery, science fiction, fantasy. On July 29, 2013, Book Country relaunched with online writing workshops in over sixty literary categories, including literary fiction, memoir, and women's fiction. As of September 2013, the site had over 10,000 members. As of November 2020 the site is no longer operational.

References

Further reading

External links 
 

 
Book publishing company imprints
Book publishing companies based in New York (state)
Publishing companies based in New York City
Publishing companies established in 2013
2013 establishments in New York City
Bertelsmann subsidiaries
American subsidiaries of foreign companies